Kjell Eide (15 September 1925 – 29 October 2011) was a Norwegian civil servant.

He was born in Ås, a son of Erling Eide, and was an economist by profession. From 1960 to 1961 he was a secretary for Per Kleppe in the Kleppe Committee. He worked for OECD from 1961 to 1964 and was a deputy under-secretary of state in the Ministry of Education and Church Affairs from 1964 to 1995. He wrote several books. He died in October 2011.

References

1925 births
2011 deaths
People from Ås, Akershus
Norwegian civil servants